Banghat is a small town which is very close to Satpuli and situated near Nayar river bank. The place is located in Pauri Garhwal district of Uttarakhand in India. It is uniquely identified by its bridge, which is one of the oldest in that part of Pauri. 

Banghat was an important place between Dugadda and Pauri Garhwal during the British Raj. It had a dak bungalow. It is the centre place for nearby villages like Bunga, Seela, Bilkhet, Chamoli, Garigaon. It is main junction between district headquarters (Pauri) and Main Mandi Duggada before the existence of Kotdwara as a business hub. It was having Jhula Pul (Bridge) to connect Langoor patti and Maniyar Patti before the construction of the new Iron Bridge. PWD used to collect toll tax for the bridge. Recently people rallied against the toll tax and in 2012 the government removed the toll tax.

Cities and towns in Pauri Garhwal district